K44 may refer to:

 K-44 (Kansas highway)
 K-44 truck, an American military truck
 Beaver Municipal Airport (Oklahoma)
 , a corvette of the Indian Navy
 Kaliber 44, a Polish hip hop band
 Sisu K-44, a Finnish lorry
 Potassium-44, an isotope of potassium